Allography, from the Greek for "other writing", has several meanings which all relate to how words and sounds are written down.

Authorship
An allograph may be the opposite of an autograph – i.e. a person's words or name (signature) written by someone else.

Script

In graphemics, the term allograph denotes any glyphs that are considered variants of a letter or other grapheme, like a number or punctuation. An obvious example in English (and many other writing systems) is the distinction between uppercase and lowercase letters. Allographs can vary greatly, without affecting the underlying identity of the grapheme. Even if the word "cat" is rendered as "cAt", it remains recognizable as the sequence of the three graphemes ‹c›, ‹a›, ‹t›. 
Thus, if a group of individual glyphs (shapes that may or may not represent the same letter) are allographs (they do represent the same letter), they all represent a single grapheme (a single instance of the smallest unit of writing). 

Letters and other graphemes can also have huge variations that may be missed by many readers. The letter g, for example, has two common forms (glyphs) in different typefaces, and an enormous variety in people's handwriting. A positional example of allography is the so-called long s, a symbol which was once a widely used non-final allograph of the lowercase letter s. A grapheme variant can acquire a separate meaning in a specialized writing system. Several such variants have distinct code points in Unicode and so ceased to be allographs for some applications. 

The fact that handwritten allographs differ so widely from person to person, and even from day to day with the same person, means that handwriting recognition software is enormously complicated.

Chinese characters

In the Chinese script, there exist several graphemes that have more than one written representation. Chinese typefaces often contain many variants of some graphemes. Different regional standards have adopted certain character variants. For instance:

{| class=wikitable
!Standard!!Allograph!!Definition
|-
|China||lang="zh-cn" align="center"|户||户
|-
|Japan||lang="ja" align="center"| 戸||戸
|-
|Taiwan||lang="zh-tw" align="center"| 戶||戶
|}

Orthography
An allograph may also be a smaller fragment of writing, that is a letter or a group of letters, which represents a particular sound. In the words cat and king, the letters c and k are both allographs of the same sound. This relationship between a letter and a sound is not necessarily fixed, for example in a different word, such as city, c is instead an allograph of an s sound.

Some words use groups of letters to represent a sound. In kick both k and ck are allographs of the sound that the c in cat represents. These associations are learned as part of learning to read and write a language. However, the development of phonetic associations is more difficult when deaf children are learning written languages. For example, without auditory knowledge of words, children are unable to associate graphemes with phonemes, or the sounds of letters or groups of letters. This lack of alphabetic knowledge correlates with delayed literacy in early learning.

Allographs have found use in humor and puns; a famous example of allographic humour is that of spelling fish as ghoti.

The primary reason that we accept all these varieties as representing the same sound or grapheme is that we have been taught to make these associations when learning to read the English language. That is to say, their meaning and correspondence is assigned arbitrarily, by conventions adopted and observed by a particular language community. Many of these associations have to be unlearned if we study a second language whose writing system is based upon, or contains many elements similar to or shared by, our own alphabet or writing system. Very often, the letters one might be comfortable and familiar with are allographs of quite different sounds in the second language. For example, in written Spanish the grapheme ⟨v⟩ will often represent the phoneme /b/, whereas in English this does not occur.

Typography

The term 'allograph' is used to describe the different representations of the same grapheme or character in different typefaces. The resulting font elements may look quite different in shape and style from the reference character or each other, but nevertheless their meaning remains the same. In Unicode, a given character is allocated a code point: all allographs of that character have the same code point and thus the essential meaning is retained irrespective of font choice at time of printing or display.

See also

References

Orthography
Writing systems
Penmanship
Typography